Xerocrassa frater is a species of air-breathing land snail, a pulmonate gastropod mollusk in the family Geomitridae. 

Subspecies
 Xerocrassa frater frater (Dohrn & Heynemann, 1862)
 Xerocrassa frater newka (Dohrn & Heynemann, 1862)
 Xerocrassa frater pollenzensis (Hidalgo, 1878)
 Xerocrassa frater pulaensis Beckmann, 2007

Distribution

This species is endemic to the Balearic island of Mallorca in Spain.

References

 Bank, R. A.; Neubert, E. (2017). Checklist of the land and freshwater Gastropoda of Europe. Last update: July 16th, 2017

External links
 Dohrn, H.; Heynemann, F. D. (1862). Zur Kenntnis der Molluskenfauna der Balearen. Malakozoologische Blätter. 9: 99-111
 Hidalgo, J. G. (1878). Catalogue des mollusques terrestres des îles Baléares. Journal de Conchyliologie. 26: 213-247, pl. 9. Paris

frater
Molluscs of Europe
Endemic fauna of the Balearic Islands
Gastropods described in 1862